The War Department (WD) "Austerity" 2-10-0 is a type of heavy freight steam locomotive that was introduced during the Second World War in 1943.

Background
The Austerity 2-10-0 was based on the Austerity 2-8-0, and was designed to have interchangeable parts by R.A. Riddles.  It had the same power output as the 2-8-0 but a lighter axle load, making it suitable for secondary lines.

Design
It had a parallel boiler and round-topped firebox.  While the 2-8-0 had a narrow firebox, the 2-10-0 had a wide firebox placed above the driving wheels.  This arrangement was common in the United States (e.g. the USRA 0-8-0) but unusual in Britain, where wide fireboxes were usually used only where there was a trailing bogie, e.g. in 4-4-2 and 4-6-2 types. These were the first 2-10-0 locomotives to work in Great Britain, and the first major class of ten-coupled engines — they had been preceded by two 0-10-0 locomotives; the Great Eastern Railway's Decapod and the Midland Railway's Lickey Banker. The 2-10-0 wheel arrangement was later used by Riddles when he designed the BR standard class 9F.  This, too, had a wide firebox placed above the driving wheels.

Construction
Two batches were built by the North British Locomotive Company, the first batch of 100 introduced in 1943/1944 and the second batch of 50 in 1945.  Their WD Nos were 3650–3749 (later 73650–73749), and 73750–73799.

20 of the first batch were sent to the Middle East. During running-in they worked in Britain, but their length made them unsuitable.  Most saw service with the British Army in France after D-Day in the drive towards the Siegfried Line.

Post-war service

After the war the 150 locomotives were distributed as follows, the majority going to the Netherlands:

Netherlands

In 1946, the Netherlands bought those in continental Europe.  They formed the NS 5000 class, and were numbered 5001-103.  They had a short working life, the last being withdrawn in 1952. 5085, ex WD 73755, the one-thousandth British built locomotive to be shipped to Europe after D-Day, was named Longmoor and subsequently preserved in the Utrecht railway museum.

British Railways 

After the war, the British Railways (BR) bought twenty-five locomotives. These were initially numbered 73774-73798 but later re-numbered 90750-74. They were mostly operated by BR's Scottish Region on heavy freight trains and were all withdrawn between 1961 and 1962.

Greece

Sixteen of the twenty Middle East locomotives went to Greece, where they formed Class Λβ of the Hellenic State Railways, numbered Λβ951 to Λβ966.

Syria

The remaining 4 Middle East locomotives remained in Syria and operated on the Chemins de Fer Syriens (CFS).  These engines formed the CFS Class 150.6.

Further WD services 

In the 1952 WD renumbering scheme, the two remaining in WD service (at the Longmoor Military Railway), Nos. 73651 and 73797, were renumbered 600 and 601 respectively. The also received names: 600 Gordon and 601 Kitchener.

Preservation
LMR 600 Gordon has survived and has been steamed on the Severn Valley Railway, though  it is out of service, cosmetically restored and on display in the Engine House.

Two more have been repatriated from Greece. One has been numbered 90775, one higher than the last BR engine, and has carried the name Sturdee (as WD/LMR No. 601 before being numbered 90775) and is operational on North Norfolk Railway where it has now been renamed The Royal Norfolk Regiment as of 2022. The other is WD No. (7)3672 which has been named Dame Vera Lynn. The loco is currently being overhaul at Grosmont on the NYMR.

The 4th one in preservation WD 73755 (NS 5085) survives in the Dutch Railway Museum (Nederlands Spoorwegmuseum) in Utrecht.  It carries the nameplate Longmoor, after the Royal Engineers base at Longmoor, with the coat of arms of the Royal Engineers above.

Four locomotives remain in various states in Greece with Λβ962 and Λβ964 operating mainline tours on the Drama to Xanthi line. Other locomotives remain in poor states stored awaiting further use.

* Name or number applied after preservation

Notes

See also
 BR ex-WD Austerity 2-10-0 - locomotives taken into LNER/BR ownership
 WD Austerity 2-8-0 - locomotives of similar design

References

Further reading

External links

 
2-10-0 locomotives
War Department locomotives
NBL locomotives
Railway locomotives introduced in 1943
Standard gauge steam locomotives of Great Britain
Freight locomotives
1′E h2 locomotives